Skógafoss (pronounced ) is a waterfall on the Skógá River in the south of Iceland at the cliff marking the former coastline.

Geography

Due to the amount of spray the waterfall consistently produces, a single or double rainbow is normally visible on sunny days. Visitors can be drenched if they go too near the waterfall, again due to the spray. According to legend, the first Viking settler in the area, Þrasi Þórólfsson, buried a treasure in a cave behind the waterfall. The legend continues that locals found the chest years later, but were only able to grasp the ring on the side of the chest before it disappeared again. The ring was allegedly given to the local church. The old church door ring is now in the Skógar museum. 

At the eastern side of the waterfall, a hiking and trekking trail leads up to the pass Fimmvörðuháls between the glaciers Eyjafjallajökull and Mýrdalsjökull. It goes down to Þórsmörk on the other side and continues as the Laugavegur trail to Landmannalaugar. A 430-step staircase leads up the slope to the top of the waterfall.

In popular culture
The waterfall was the setting for Sólstafir's 2012 music video "Fjara" of their album Svartir Sandar.

The waterfall was the site of the opening task during the second episode of the twelfth season of the Dutch reality television series Wie is de Mol?.

The waterfall was a location for the filming of the Marvel Studios film Thor: The Dark World, as well as The Secret Life of Walter Mitty. The waterfall has been used as one of the locations of song "Gerua", in the 2015 Bollywood movie Dilwale featuring Shahrukh Khan and Kajol.

The official music video of "I'll Show You" features glacial lagoons and rivers in South Iceland, including the waterfall Skógafoss.

In season 5 of the History Channel series, Vikings, the character Floki witnesses Skógafoss when he discovers Iceland.

In season 8 of the Game of Thrones series, Daenerys Targaryen and Jon Snow fly to this waterfall with her dragons and kiss in front of it.

Gallery

See also
Waterfalls of Iceland
List of waterfalls

References

External links

 More information and photos about Skógafoss on Hit Iceland
 Skógafoss panoramic virtual tour
 Drone flight

Waterfalls of Iceland